"Mad About You" is a song by the Belgian band Hooverphonic, released as the lead single from their third studio album, The Magnificent Tree (2000). "Mad About You" is often considered the band's masterpiece and its biggest worldwide success.

The song features a sweeping string arrangement that typifies the trip hop genre. It is also similar in style to a Bond-style film theme, with its dramatic orchestration and lyrics. The song is about a forbidden love, an idea also conveyed in the video, with the lyrics of "Can someone tell me if it's wrong to be so mad about you?".

In an interview with MNM, Alex Callier revealed that the inspiration for the song came from his encounters with Cathy Dennis, who he had first met at a songwriting camp in 1998 where they had had a disagreement over fishy wine, and he also recalled a wild car ride with her through London, occasionally driving in the wrong lane. Anecdotes that ended up being referenced in the lyrics of Mad About You.

Usage in the media 

It was used in the episode "Sanctuary" of the CBS series Cold Case (season 3, episode 15).

The song is also played in the Netflix show The Umbrella Academy (season 1, episode 8).

The song is also used in the Netflix limited series The Innocent (Episode 6)

It was used in an episode of the NBC series Las Vegas (Montecito Lancers: season 2, episode 7).

Covers 
Cantonese pop singer Joey Yung covered the song in Cantonese on her 2002 album Something About You.

Influences 

In its Hooverphonic with Orchestra Live version, the song features the same opening as the Daydream hit from the also Belgian band Wallace Collection, and both songs feature themes from Swan Lake's final scene.

This was an idea from Cédric Murrath, who is both the violinist from Wallace Collection's reformation and the conductor of the Hooverphonic with Orchestra Live.

Charts

References

2000 singles
2000 songs
Columbia Records singles
Hooverphonic songs
Songs written by Alex Callier